Christoph Burkhard (born 19 November 1984) is a German former professional footballer who played as a defender.

Career
Burkhard was born in Aichach. He made his professional debut in the 2. Bundesliga for TSV 1860 Munich on 18 August 2006 coming on as a substitute in the 86th minute in a game against Kickers Offenbach.

References

External links
 
 

1984 births
Living people
People from Aichach
Sportspeople from Swabia (Bavaria)
German footballers
TSV 1860 Munich players
TSV 1860 Munich II players
SV Wacker Burghausen players
Association football defenders
2. Bundesliga players
3. Liga players
Regionalliga players
Footballers from Bavaria